Liliane Wouters (5 February 193028 February 2016) was a Belgian poet, playwright, translator, anthologist and essayist.

Life
Wouters was born in Ixelles and taught school from 1949 to 1990. She met Albert Andrew Lheureux and his Théâtre de l'Esprit Frappeur.

She was a Member of the Royal Academy of French Language and Literature of Belgium and the European Academy of Poetry.

Awards
 1955 Prix Renée Vivien
 1961 Triennial Prize for Poetry
 Montaigne Prize, Foundation Friedrich von Schiller (Hamburg)
 2000 Prix Goncourt for poetry
 2000 Five Year Award for Literature

Works

English translations
"To the child I did not have", Sedulia

French language
La Marche forcée, poésie, Bruxelles, Éditions des Artistes, Georges Houyoux, 1954.
Le Bois sec, poésie, Paris, Gallimard, 1960.
Belles heures de Flandre, adaptation de poèmes (Poésie flamande du Moyen-Âge), Paris, Pierre Seghers, 1961 (rééd. Bruxelles, Éditions Les Éperonniers, coll. « Passé-Présent, 1997).
Oscarine ou les tournesols, théâtre, création du Rideau de Bruxelles, 1964.
Guido Gezelle, essai et adaptation de poèmes, Paris, Pierre Seghers, coll. «Poètes d'aujourd'hui», 1965.
Le Gel, poésie, Paris, Pierre Seghers, 1966.
La Porte, théâtre, création Festival du Jeune Théâtre, Liège, 1967.
Bréviaire des Pays-Bas, adaptation de poèmes (Poésie flamande du Moyen-Age), Paris, Éditions Universitaires, 1973.
Reynart le Goupil, adaptation du poème du moyen néerlandais, Bruxelles, Éditions La Renaissance du Livre, 1974.
Panorama de la poésie française de Belgique, anthologie, Bruxelles, Éditions Jacques Antoine, 1976.
Vies et morts de Mademoiselle Shakespeare, théâtre, création Théâtre de l'Esprit Frappeur, Bruxelles, 1979.
Terre d'écarts, anthologie, en collaboration avec André Miguel, Paris, Éditions Universitaires, 1980.
La Célestine, adaptation (d'après Fernando de Rojas), théâtre, Théâtre Royal du Parc, Bruxelles, 1981.
Le monument (un acte du spectacle collectif Le 151e), théâtre, Maison de la Culture de Mons, 1981.
La mort de Cléopâtre (un acte du spectacle collectif Cléopâtre), théâtre, Théâtre de l'Esprit Frappeur, Bruxelles, 1982.
Autour d'une dame de qualité, pièce en un acte, théâtre, création Atelier d'écriture, Neufchâteau, 1983.
La salle des profs, théâtre, création Maison de la Culture de Mons, Théâtre de l'Esprit Frappeur, Bruxelles, Éditions Jacques Antoine, 1983 (rééd. Bruxelles, Éditions Labor).
L'Aloès, poésie, Paris, Luneau-Ascot, 1983.
Parenthèse, poésie, Le Verbe et l'Empreinte, Saint-Laurent-du-Pont (France), 1984.
Ça rime et ça rame, anthologie pour les jeunes, Bruxelles, Éditions Labor, 1985. 
L'Équateur, théâtre, création Théâtre de l'Esprit frappeur (Botanique), 1986.
L'Équateur, suivi de Vies et Morts de Mademoiselle Shakespeare, théâtre, Bruxelles, Éditions Jacques Antoine, 1986.
Charlotte ou la nuit mexicaine, théâtre, Bruxelles, Éditions Les Éperonniers, 1989.
Journal du scribe, poésie, Bruxelles, Les Éperonniers, 1990.
Le jour du Narval, théâtre, Bruxelles, Éditions Les Éperonniers, 1991.
La poésie francophone de Belgique, avec Alain Bosquet, anthologie, 4 tomes, Bruxelles, Éditions de l'ARLLFB, 1992.
Tous les chemins conduisent à la mer, poésie, Bruxelles, Les Eperonniers, coll. «Passé Présent», 1997.
Un compagnon pour toutes les saisons, traduction, Guido Gezelle, Autres Temps, Marseille, 1999.
Le Billet de Pascal, poésie, Luxembourg, Éditions Phi, 2000.
Le siècle des femmes, avec Yves Namur, anthologie, Bruxelles, Éditions Les Éperonniers, 2000.
Changer d'écorce, poésie, Tournai, La Renaissance du Livre, 2001.
Poètes aujourd'hui: un panorama de la poésie francophone de Belgique (avec Yves Namur), anthologie,
Châtelineau/Saint-Hippolyte, Le Taillis pré/Le Noroît, 2007.
Paysages flamands avec nonnes, mémoires, Paris, Gallimard, 2007.
Le Livre du Soufi, poésie, Châtelineau, Le Taillis Pré, 2009.

References

1930 births
2016 deaths
20th-century Belgian dramatists and playwrights
Belgian women dramatists and playwrights
20th-century Belgian poets
20th-century translators
20th-century Belgian women writers
21st-century Belgian poets
21st-century translators
21st-century Belgian women writers
Belgian translators
Belgian poets in French
People from Ixelles
Prix Goncourt de la Poésie winners
Women anthologists
Belgian women essayists
Belgian women poets
Belgian essayists
20th-century essayists
21st-century essayists
Prix Guillaume Apollinaire winners